Randy Pettapiece (born ) is a politician in Ontario, Canada. He was a Progressive Conservative member of the Legislative Assembly of Ontario who represented the riding of Perth—Wellington as MPP from 2011 until he stood down at the 2022 election.

Background
Pettapiece was born and raised on a farm near Cottam, Ontario. He owns a decorating business.

Politics
Pettapiece served two terms as a councillor for the township of North Perth, Ontario.

In the 2011 provincial election, he ran as the Progressive Conservative candidate in the riding of Perth—Wellington. He defeated Liberal incumbent John Wilkinson by 210 votes. He was re-elected in the 2014 election defeating Liberal candidate Stewart Skinner by 2,486 votes.

He is the party's critic for Community and Social Services and for Horse Racing.

Electoral record

References

External links

1949 births
Living people
People from Perth County, Ontario
Progressive Conservative Party of Ontario MPPs
21st-century Canadian politicians